Greg Day (born February 25, 1977) is a Canadian former professional ice hockey forward who most recently played for the Graz 99ers of the Austrian Hockey League (EBEL).

Playing career
Day was born in St Clair Beach, Ontario. He spent four seasons playing for Bowling Green State University before turning professional in 2002.  He spent the next two seasons playing in the ECHL for the Peoria Rivermen and the Las Vegas Wranglers and in the American Hockey League for the Worcester IceCats and the Lowell Lock Monsters.  In 2004, Day moved to the European leagues and spent one season in the French Ligue Magnus for HC Mulhouse and then spent one season playing in Norway's GET-ligaen for Vålerenga Ishockey before joining Graz 99ers of the EBEL in 2006.  Day had a short spell in Italy's Serie A for Milano Vipers during the 2007–08 season but eventually returned to Graz.

Day joined HC Thurgau of the Swiss National League B for the 2010–11 campaign. After posting 30 points in 25 games, Day then joined Croatian team KHL Medveščak on loan for the remainder of the season on December 18, 2010.

Career statistics

References

External links

1977 births
Living people
Bowling Green Falcons men's ice hockey players
Canadian ice hockey forwards
Graz 99ers players
Ice hockey people from Ontario
KHL Medveščak Zagreb players
Las Vegas Wranglers players
Lowell Lock Monsters players
Peoria Rivermen (ECHL) players
Vålerenga Ishockey players
Worcester IceCats players
Canadian expatriate ice hockey players in Austria
Canadian expatriate ice hockey players in Croatia
Canadian expatriate ice hockey players in Norway